Heather Baker (born October 9, 1984) is an American producer, guitarist and musical director. Baker is known for being a session and touring guitar player for the likes of Olivia Rodrigo, Miley Cyrus, Demi Lovato, Adam Lambert, Bea Miller, Bonnie Mckee and many more. Her musical direction clients include Olivia Rodrigo, Tegan and Sara, Ricky Montgomery, Meg Myers, Em Beihold, Peter McPoland and many others under Direction Music Group, a musical direction collective based in Los Angeles, California.

Biography
In 2004, Heather Baker and a group of friends formed the band As Night Falls, releasing their debut EP The End of All Innocence in 2004. In February 2007, Baker joined The Iron Maidens (world's only female tribute to Iron Maiden). She joined vocalist Aja Kim, guitarist Sara Marsh, bassist Wanda Ortiz and drummer Linda McDonald as part of the Maidens' 2007–2008 lineup. Baker's stage name was "Adrienne Smith," a female version of Iron Maiden guitarist Adrian Smith, until her official departure in 2010.

In 2011 Baker joined the post hardcore band Fake Figures, who released their debut EP Hail The Sycophants, followed by They Must Be Destroyed in 2013, featuring Travis Miguel of Atreyu, and Rus Martin of Hotwire.

Baker joined songwriter Bonnie McKee for the release of her single "American Girl" in 2013 and began playing for a variety of pop artists over the following years.

In 2013, Baker began commercial composing and arranging for feature films and television including soundtrack music for Holy Ghost People (2013), Raised by Wolves (2014), A Beginner's Guide To Snuff (2015), Little Paradise (2015), The Night Watchmen (2016), Dead Draw (2016), Cynthia (2017), Embeds (2017 TV series) and Starlight (2019).

Discography

As Night Falls
 The End of All Innocence (2004)

The Iron Maidens
 Route 666 (2007; audio CD only)
 The Root of All Evil (2008)

Fake Figures
 Hail The Sycophants (2011)
 They Must Be Destroyed (2014)

Piano Heist
 Shapeshifter (2014)

Antiwave
 Holiday Heart (2016)
 Agent of Sleep (2017)

References

External links
 Heather Baker - official website
 Surviving the Golden Age - Antiwave Premiere of Holiday Heart
 Buzzbands LA: Ears Wide Open - Antiwave - Holiday Heart
 Soundcloud: Antiwave - Holiday Heart - Single
 Sound in the Signals: Antiwave - Holiday Heart - Press Release
 
 
 The Iron Maidens official site
 The Iron Maidens official Japanese site

Living people
1984 births
American heavy metal guitarists
American women singer-songwriters
People from Yorba Linda, California
Singer-songwriters from California
Guitarists from California
21st-century American women singers
21st-century American women guitarists
21st-century American guitarists
American women heavy metal singers